Angel Falls is a  waterfall on Mountain Brook in Township D – northwest of Houghton – in the White Mountains of Franklin County, Maine. Angel Falls is so named as, when the water flow is right, the falls appear as an angel.

External links
Angel Falls Hike Report 
Angel Falls at "Maine Through the Lens"
Angel Falls hiking recollection

References

Waterfalls of Maine
Landforms of Franklin County, Maine
Tourist attractions in Franklin County, Maine
Horsetail waterfalls